The Cando is a river of eastern San Marino. It rises to the east of Monte San Cristoforo, flowing northeast to join with the Marano near the town of Faetano.

Rivers of San Marino
Adriatic Italian coast basins